"Situations" is a song by German synth-pop band Cetu Javu, released in 1988 as their second single. It was the first single from their 1990 debut album Southern Lands, appearing in a remixed version.

Track listings
7" vinyl
GER: ZYX Records / ZYX 1387

12" vinyl
 ZYX Records / ZYX-5864

CD single
 GER: ZYX Records / ZYX 8-5864

References

1988 songs
1988 singles
Cetu Javu songs
ZYX Music singles